Asllani is a surname. Notable people with the surname include:

Ali Asllani, (1884–1966), Albanian poet
Klodian Asllani (born 1977), Albanian footballer
Kosovare Asllani (born 1989), Albanian-Swedish footballer
Kristjan Asllani (born 2002), Albanian footballer

Albanian-language surnames
Patronymic surnames
Surnames from given names